The "Kolkata class" (Project 15A) are a class of stealth guided-missile destroyers constructed for the Indian Navy. The class comprises three ships – Kolkata, Kochi and Chennai, all of which were built by Mazagon Dock Limited (MDL) in India, and are the largest destroyers to be operated by the Indian Navy. Due to delays in construction and sea trials, the initial commissioning date of the first ship of the class was pushed back from 2010 to 2014.

The destroyers are a follow-on of the Project 15 s, but are considerably more capable due to major improvements in the design, the addition of substantial land-attack capabilities, the fitting-out of modern sensors and weapons systems, and the expanded use of net-centric capability such as Cooperative Engagement Capability.

Design 
The Kolkata class share similar dimensions to the previous Delhi class, however they have 2,363 modifications which include major upgrades in weaponry, sensors and helicopter systems. These are the first stealth destroyers built by India and marked a significant development in India's shipbuilding technology. The ships incorporate modern weapons and sensors, and have an advanced information warfare suite, an auxiliary control system with a sophisticated power distribution architecture, and modular crew quarters.

The ship's power and propulsion features a combined gas and gas system utilizing four DT-59 reversible gas turbines. Aviation facilities include a large flight deck, which was re-designed to handle larger helicopters than the Delhi class, and an enclosed hangar for up to two maritime helicopters.

The primary radar sensor of the class is the EL/M-2248 MF-STAR multi-mission AESA. It is also equipped with Thales LW-08 long range volume search radar.

The ship's main air-defence armament is composed of four eight-cell vertical launching systems (VLS) allowing for up to thirty-two  Barak 8 / MRSAM air defence missiles.

The class is designed for network-centric warfare such as Cooperative Engagement Capability, where they operate wide-area air defense, distributing assets and control over different platforms and locations, and harnessing multiple sensors & effectors into a single air defense system. In May 2019, 2 ships of the class conducted the maiden cooperative engagement firing of the  Barak 8 / MRSAM by using the Joint Taskforce Coordination (JTC) mode to intercept several simultaneous aerial targets involving two complex scenarios at extended ranges. With it, the Indian Navy became the second naval service in the world after the United States, and the first in Asia to have developed and deployed it. The capability is to be rolled out on all future major warships of the Indian Navy.

Four AK-630 CIWSs are fitted for close-in defence.

The supersonic BrahMos anti-ship and land-attack missiles are the primary offensive armament of the Kolkata class. The BrahMos missiles are fitted into a 16-cell Universal Vertical Launcher Module (UVLM) allowing one missile per launch silo, and all 16 missiles can be fired in salvo.

The class carries a  naval gun located forward of the bridge, which provides limited anti-shipping capability and anti-air capability in addition to its naval gun fire-support role for land-based operations.

A bow-mounted sonar HUMSA-NG (hull-mounted sonar array – new generation) is carried for sub-surface surveillance.

For anti-submarine warfare, the Kolkata class are equipped with a torpedo launching system via four torpedo tubes and two RBU-6000 anti-submarine rocket launchers.

BEL's Electronic Modular Command & Control Applications (EMCCA) Mk4 provides combat management.

Forty lakh (four million) lines of codes have been written to develop the advanced combat management system onboard INS Kochi. The system is designed so that all the data about the surrounding threat comes in one place, along with analysis of the kind of threat. The system also advises the commanding officer about the kind of weaponry he should use to tackle the threat in real time. The ship is equipped with sophisticated digital networks, such as Asynchronous Transfer Mode based Integrated Ship Data Network (AISDN), Combat Management System (CMS), Automatic Power Management System (APMS) and Auxiliary Control System (ACS). The AISDN is the information highway on which data from all the sensors and weapon ride. The CMS is used to integrate information from other platforms using an indigenous data-link system to provide Maritime Domain Awareness. The intricate power supply management is done using APMS, and remote control and monitoring of machinery is achieved through the ACS.

Development

In 1986, the Cabinet Committee on Political Affairs (CCPA) approved a follow-on class of the earlier Project 15 Delhi-class destroyers. The aim was that the follow-on class would incorporate a higher level of air-defence, land attack, anti-submarine, and anti-ship capabilities than the preceding class. However, the Indian Navy did not initially take up the option. By the year 2000, the Indian Navy had redesigned the follow-on Kolkata class to incorporate even higher levels of technology (including modern stealth characteristics) and in May of that year, approval for the construction was given. The concept and function for Project 15A was framed by the navy's Directorate of Naval Design, while the detailed design was developed by Mazagon Dock Limited (MDL).

Initially in 2008, the total program cost with long-term spare parts was expected to cost , but the construction costs escalated about 225%, and by 2011, cost of the program became , with each ship costing . The Defense Minister A. K. Antony cited the causes being the delay in supply of warship-grade steel by Russia, increase in costs of Russian specialists due to inflation during the build period, wage revision due from October 2003 and delay in finalisation of cost of weapons and sensors. A Comptroller and Auditor General of India report published in 2010 blamed the Navy for delays, criticising the late decisions for replacement of surface to air missile system with Barak, change of gun mount, inclusion of a sonar dome and modification of helicopter hangar to accommodate HAL Dhruv.

Construction
Construction of three Kolkata-class ships was sanctioned by the Government of India in May 2000, and steel for the lead ship was cut in March 2003. Construction began in September 2003 at Mazagon Docks, Mumbai, with an initial expectation that the first of the class would be handed over to the navy by 2010. However, since then the Kolkata class has suffered consecutive delays, slow construction procedures, and technical problems, which saw the first ship of the class enter service during mid-2014. The delays in the construction programme have been attributed to persistent design changes made by the Indian Navy to incorporate new weapons systems and sensors, failure by a Ukrainian shipyard to deliver the ship's propellers and shafts, and the contract later being awarded to a Russian firm, and finally the delay in the delivery of the Barak 8 anti-air missiles.

The Kolkata class are the largest destroyers ever to be constructed at Mazagon Docks. Technical problems were found during the sea trials of the lead ship Kolkata, which delayed the project by six months to early 2014.

Ships of the class

Gallery

See also
 List of active Indian Navy ships
 List of naval ship classes in service
 Future of the Indian Navy
 Project 17A-class frigate – A planned frigate class of the Indian Navy.

References

External links

 Kolkata-class destroyer – Bharat Rakshak
 Aegis Vessels of the World – Kolkata-class – details on the specifications of the ship and recent images of INS Kolkata at sea.

 

 
Destroyers of the Indian Navy
Destroyer classes
Ships built in India